The 24 Hours of Portimão is both a sports car and touring car automobile endurance race held annually at the Algarve International Circuit. It was inaugurated in 2017. The race is currently part of 24H GT Series and Touring Car Endurance Series.

Entrants and participants
As with all races in the 24H Series, promoted by Dutch promoter Creventic, they are open to both professional and semi-professional teams. 
The races are contested with GT3-spec cars, GT4-spec cars, sports cars, touring cars and 24H-Specials, like silhouette cars.

History
The first race took part in 2017 as part of 2017 24H Series, the 3rd season with FIA status. 
Since 2018 the race became also part of Touring Car Endurance Series, and in that same year was part of 2018 24H Proto Series.
The 2021 race was cancelled due to Covid-19.

Race winners

Manufacturer title wins

See also
 24H Series
 Touring Car Endurance Series

References

External links
 

24H Series
Auto races in Portugal
Sports car races
Touring car races
Endurance motor racing
Recurring sporting events established in 2017